is a former Japanese football player.

Playing career
Ikeuchi was born in Tobetsu, Hokkaido on November 1, 1977. After graduating from high school, he joined the J1 League club Kashima Antlers in 1996. However he did not actually play in any matches from then through 1998. In 1999, he moved to the J2 League club Consadole Sapporo on loan. He played as a defensive midfielder and side back for two seasons and the club won the championship in 2000. In 2001, he returned to Kashima Antlers. He played as a center back and the club won the championship of the 2001 J1 League and the 2002 J.League Cup. However, he did not get as much playing time in 2004 as younger players Seiji Kaneko and Daiki Iwamasa. In 2005, he moved to the J2 club Consadole Sapporo again. He became a regular player as a left back of a three-back defense. In 2007, he played side back of a four-back defense and the club won the championship and was promoted to J1 in 2008. Although he played often, he retired at the end of the 2008 season.

Club statistics

References

External links

1977 births
Living people
Association football people from Hokkaido
Japanese footballers
J1 League players
J2 League players
Kashima Antlers players
Hokkaido Consadole Sapporo players
Association football defenders